South Carolina Highway 400 (SC 400) is a  state highway in the U.S. state of South Carolina. The highway connects Norway with rural areas of Orangeburg County.

Route description
SC 400 begins at an intersection with U.S. Route 321 (US 321) and SC 332 (Savannah Highway/Norway Road) in Norway, Orangeburg County. It travels to the east-southeast and leaves the town limits. The highway curves to the east-northeast and crosses over Deadfall Swamp, Roberts Swamp, and Twomile Swamp before entering Bolen Town. While there, it curves to a more easterly direction. SC 400 heads to the east-northeast again before it meets its eastern terminus, an intersection with SC 4 (Neeses Highway) at a point west of Edisto.

Major intersections

See also

References

External links

SC 400 at Virginia Highways' South Carolina Highways Annex

400
Transportation in Orangeburg County, South Carolina